Vitricythara metria is a species of sea snail, a marine gastropod mollusk in the family Mangeliidae.

Description
The length of the shell attains 5 mm.

Distribution
This marine species occurs from North Carolina, USA, Guadeloupe, French Guiana to Colombia.

References

External links
  Rosenberg, G.; Moretzsohn, F.; García, E. F. (2009). Gastropoda (Mollusca) of the Gulf of Mexico, Pp. 579–699 in: Felder, D.L. and D.K. Camp (eds.), Gulf of Mexico–Origins, Waters, and Biota. Texas A&M Press, College Station, Texas
  Tucker, J.K. 2004 Catalog of recent and fossil turrids (Mollusca: Gastropoda). Zootaxa 682:1–1295.
 Worldwide Mollusc Species Data Base: Vitjazinella multicostata

metria
Gastropods described in 1903